KJM can mean:

 the Kyoto Jazz Massive
 the German Commission for Youth Media Protection (German: Kommission für Jugendmedienschutz, KJM)